This is a list of populated places in the Caribbean.  Only the major metropolitan areas and largest populated or significant places in each country, national region/district, or national territory are listed.  In most cases, the largest populated place for a given country, national region, or territory is the capital.

Largest populated places

Notes:

Map of places

Cities in other nearby countries

 List of cities in Bermuda
 List of cities in Colombia
 List of cities in French Guiana
 List of cities in Guyana
 List of cities in Suriname
 List of cities in Venezuela
 List of cities in Nicaragua
 List of cities in Panama

See also
 List of Caribbean countries by population
 List of metropolitan areas in the West Indies
 List of national capitals by population
 List of sovereign states and dependent territories in the West Indies

References

Caribbean geography-related lists
Caribbean